Jamaladdin Gadzhievich Magomedov (born March 14, 1989, in Makhachkala) is a Russian-born naturalized Azerbaijani freestyle wrestler of Avar descent, who played for the men's super heavyweight category. In 2011, Magomedov had won two bronze medals at the World Wrestling Championships in Istanbul, Turkey, and at the European Wrestling Championships in Dortmund, Germany. He is also a member of Atasport Wrestling Club in Baku, and is coached and trained by Anvar Magomedgadzhiev of Russia.

Magomedov represented his current nation Azerbaijan at the 2012 Summer Olympics in London, where he competed for the men's 120 kg class. He lost the qualifying match to Russia's Bilyal Makhov, who was able to score five points in two straight periods, leaving Magomedov without a single point.

At the 2016 Olympics, he lost to Tervel Dlagnev in the second round. In March 2021, he competed at the European Qualification Tournament in Budapest, Hungary hoping to qualify for the 2020 Summer Olympics in Tokyo, Japan.

References

External links
Profile – International Wrestling Database
NBC Olympics Profile 

Azerbaijani male sport wrestlers
1989 births
Living people
Olympic wrestlers of Azerbaijan
Wrestlers at the 2012 Summer Olympics
Sportspeople from Makhachkala
European Games bronze medalists for Azerbaijan
Wrestlers at the 2015 European Games
European Games medalists in wrestling
World Wrestling Championships medalists
Wrestlers at the 2016 Summer Olympics
Wrestlers at the 2019 European Games
Islamic Solidarity Games medalists in wrestling
Islamic Solidarity Games competitors for Azerbaijan